The B.C. Catholic is a weekly newspaper serving the needs of the Catholic community in British Columbia and is the official newspaper of the Roman Catholic Archdiocese of Vancouver. It was founded in 1931 and is published approximately forty-eight times a year from the archdiocese's main offices in Vancouver. The B.C. Catholic is a member of Canadian Catholic News and the Catholic Press Association of the United States and Canada.

History 

The B.C. Catholic was established in 1931 by Archbishop Mark Duke and has been the official newspaper for the Roman Catholic Archdiocese of Vancouver (RCAV) ever since. The newspaper began as the Bulletin in 1924 through to 1931, when it became The B.C. Catholic.

Editors 

 Father D.J Carey August 15, 1931 - June 30, 1934
 Father Thomas B. Freeney July 7, 1934 – January 19, 1935
 Father Aidan Angle November 9, 1935 – April 10, 1937
 A. F. Carlyle May 29, 1937 – April 2, 1938

Columnists 

 Fr. Vincent Hawkshell
 Fr. Anthony Ho
 Julie Vanspall
 Alan Charlton
 Paul Schratz
 Pat Macken
 Jenna McDonald
 Lisa Rumpel
 Clare Lazzuri
 Anna Loch
 Dr. Gerry Turcotte
 Fr. Justin Huang
 Peter Vogel
 Msgr. Pedro Lopez-Gallo (retired)
 Colleen Roy
 Emi Nemoro

Reporters 

 Agnieszka Krawczynski

See also 

Roman Catholic Archdiocese of Vancouver

References

External links 

 Official website of the B.C. Catholic

Catholic newspapers
Publications established in 1931
1931 establishments in British Columbia